ESE or Ese may refer to:

Words
 Ēse, gods in Germanic paganism
 Ese language, a language of Papua New Guinea
 Ese (river), a river in the department of Corse-du-Sud, Corsica, France
 Ese Mrabure-Ajufo (born 1992), Canadian football player

Abbreviations
 Early streamer emission
 East-southeast, a compass direction (one of the eight "half-winds")
 Easy Serving Espresso Pod
 Ethical Sensory Extrovert
 European School of Economics
 European Society of Endocrinology
 Exonic splicing enhancer
 Exoskeletal engine
 Extensible Storage Engine
 Massachusetts Department of Elementary and Secondary Education